Remi Kabaka (born 27 March 1945) is an Afro-rock avant-garde drummer. He worked with John Martyn, Hugh Masekela, on Rhythm of the Saints by Paul Simon, and Short Cut Draw Blood by Jim Capaldi. He was also an important figure in the 1970s afro-jazz scene, composing the music to the film Black Goddess.

Discography
 1973: Aiye-Keta  (with Steve Winwood and Abdul Lasisi Amao, as Third World)
 1980: Roots Funkadelia  (Polydor)
 1983: Great Nation (R.A.K.)
 2020: Mystic Souls appears as a guest with The Jazz Messiahs track #4, #5, #6, #7, #8) (Soulitude Records) JM S-1205-2 url=https://www.soulituderecords.com/the-jazz-messiahs

References

1945 births
Living people
musicians from Kano
Nigerian drummers
Antilles Records artists